HyperPhysics is an educational website about physics topics. 
The information architecture of the website is based on HyperCard, the platform on which the material was originally developed, and a thesaurus organization, with thousands of controlled links and usual trees organizing topics from general to specific. It also exploits concept maps to facilitate smooth navigation. HyperPhysics is hosted by Georgia State University and authored by Georgia State faculty member Dr. Rod Nave.

Various teaching and education facilitators make use of HyperPhysics material through projects
and organizations, and also publishers which use SciLinks.

Topics

Physics
Various areas of physics are accessible through broad categories.
 Astrophysics
 Condensed matter
 Electricity and magnetism
 Heat and thermodynamics
 Light and vision
 Mechanics
 Nuclear physics
 Quantum physics
 Relativity
 Sound and hearing

Mathematics
Related applied mathematics are also covered.
Algebra
Calculus
Differential equations
Exponents
Geometry
Linear algebra
Logarithms
Trigonometry
Vectors

References

External links

American educational websites
Physics websites